Leonardo, the Terrible Monster is a children's picture book by Mo Willems.  An ALA Notable Book, it was released in 2005 by Hyperion Books. In 2007, Weston Woods adapted the book to an animated film, directed by Pete List.

Plot 
Leonardo is truly a terrible monster - terrible at being a monster, that is. No matter how hard he tries, he can't seem to frighten anyone. Determined to succeed, Leonardo sets himself to training and research. Finally, he finds a nervous little boy, and scares the tuna salad out of him! But scaring people isn't quite as satisfying as he thought it would be. Leonardo realizes that he might be a terrible, awful monster-but he could be a really good friend.

Reception
Kirkus Reviews called it a "sweetly original morality play about a very unscary monster", while Publishers Weekly wrote " Willems's (Don't Let the Pigeon Drive the Bus! ) finale feels apt but syrupy; Leonardo's decision to be nice seems homiletic. Yet this is an appealing book, sketched in dark brown against grayish pastel backdrops, with evergreen lettering and highlighted keywords."

It is listed in the 2009 literary reference book 1001 Children's Books You Must Read Before You Grow Up.

Sequel
In 2017, the sequel, Sam, the Most Scaredy-Cat Kid in the Whole World, was released.

References
 

American picture books
2005 children's books
Children's fiction books